Jean-Louis Christ (born 24 January 1951 in Ribeauvillé) was a member of the National Assembly of France.  He represented Haut-Rhin's 2nd constituency from 2002 to 2017. as a member of the Union for a Popular Movement.

Bibliography 

 "Célibat et mondialisation" (Celibacy and Globalization), in Jules Barbey d'Aurevilly ou le triomphe de l'écriture : pour une nouvelle lecture de Un prêtre marié     by Jean-Pierre Thiollet, H & D, Paris, 2006, pp. 175–181.''

References

1951 births
Living people
People from Ribeauvillé
Union for a Popular Movement politicians
The Social Right
Deputies of the 12th National Assembly of the French Fifth Republic
Deputies of the 13th National Assembly of the French Fifth Republic
Deputies of the 14th National Assembly of the French Fifth Republic